Glenn Ross Switkes (1951 – December 21, 2009) was an American environmentalist and film-maker.

Film career
Switkes studied history at Columbia University and filmmaking at the University of California, Berkeley. While finishing his degree in filmmaking, Glenn co-produced with Randy Hayes and Toby McLeod the award-winning Four Corners: A National Sacrifice Area? about the effect of mining on the people and land of the southwestern United States. After visiting the Amazon, he and his first wife Monti Aguirre made a documentary film: Amazonia: Voices of the Rainforest.

Environmental Activism Career
After completing Amazonia: Voices of the Rainforest, Switkes joined Rainforest Action Network as its Western Amazon oil campaigner. In 1994 he joined International Rivers and moved to Brazil with his second wife Selma Barros de Oliveira.

Personal life
Glenn Switkes was born in New York City to working class parents and had one brother, Daniel. With his second wife, Selma, he had one son Gabriel (Gabo). He was a lifelong fan of the New York Yankees and the music of the Grateful Dead and Bob Dylan.

Death
Switkes was diagnosed with lung cancer in December 2009 and died 10 days later. He was survived by his wife Selma and son Gabriel. At the time he was serving as Amazon Program Director of the Berkeley, California-based International Rivers (formerly known as International Rivers Network, or IRN).

References

External links
 Obituary at International Rivers
 
 "Glenn Switkes, Amazon rivers advocate, dies," January 12, 2010

1951 births
2009 deaths
American environmentalists
Columbia University alumni
People from Brooklyn
Activists from New York (state)
University of California, Berkeley alumni
Film directors from New York City